Tansila is a town and seat of the Tansila Department of Banwa Province in western Burkina Faso. In 2005 it had a population of 3,876.

References

Populated places in the Boucle du Mouhoun Region
Banwa Province